48 Portraits is a group of works by the German painter Gerhard Richter. In the years  Richter created a series of portraits of personalities who influenced modernity in a photorealistic manner. They all portray exclusively men. Oriented towards a central imaginary observer, they give the impression of a modern painted frieze of portrait heads. Richter participated in the 1972 edition of the Venice Biennale with this work. They are exhibited in the Museum Ludwig in Cologne.  

The series includes portraits of the following persons:

References

External links 

 48 Portraits at Gerhard-Richter.com

1970s paintings
Sets of portraits
Paintings by Gerhard Richter